Novosad is a rural locality (a settlement) in Svetloyarsky District, Volgograd Oblast, Russia. The population was 508 as of 2010.

Geography 
Novosad is located 43 km southwest of Svetly Yar (the district's administrative centre) by road. Privolzhsky is the nearest rural locality.

References 

Rural localities in Svetloyarsky District